József Rippl-Rónai (23 May 1861 – 25 November 1927) was a Hungarian painter. He first introduced modern artistic movements in the Hungarian art.

Biography
He was born in Kaposvár. After his studies at the High School there, he went to study in Budapest, where he obtained a degree in pharmacology. In 1884 he travelled to Munich to study painting at the Academy. Two years later he obtained a grant which enabled him to move to Paris and study with Munkácsy, the most important Hungarian realist painter. In 1888 he met the members of Les Nabis and under their influence he painted his first important work, The Inn at Pont-Aven, a deeply felt work notable for its dark atmosphere. His first big success was his painting My Grandmother (1894). He also painted a portrait of Hungarian pianist and composer Zdenka Ticharich (1921).

Later he returned to Hungary, where critical reception was at first lukewarm, but he eventually had a very successful exhibition entitled "Rippl-Rónai Impressions 1890-1900". He believed that for an artist not only is his body of work significant, but also his general modus vivendi, even including the clothes he wore. He thus became interested in design, which led to commissions such as the dining room and the entire furnishings of the Andrássy palace, and a stained-glass window in the Ernst Museum, (both in Budapest). Between 1911 and 1913 his exhibitions in Frankfurt, Munich and Vienna were highly successful. His last major work, a portrait of his friend Zorka, was painted in 1919, and in 1927 he died at his home, the Villa Róma in Kaposvár.

Selected paintings

References

Sources

External links 

 
 Fine Arts in Hungary

1861 births
1927 deaths
19th-century Hungarian painters
20th-century Hungarian painters
Post-impressionist painters
People from Kaposvár
Hungarian male painters
19th-century Hungarian male artists
20th-century Hungarian male artists